Almardamah is a town in Saudi Arabia located on the north-western district of Riyadh province, managed by Riyadh Municipality and headed by the mayor of Almardamah Sheikh: Nasir bin Waraek Alhers Al-Otaibi  .

Location
It is located in north-western Najed approximately 20 miles (37 km) south of Afif.

Population
The population of Almardamah was 7,000 at the 2010 census. It is considered one of the fastest growing mid-population towns in the Riyadh Province in Saudi Arabia.

Education
Almardamah is a home to one college and several schools.

See also 

 List of cities and towns in Saudi Arabia
 Regions of Saudi Arabia

References
 Almardamah Town Website  

Populated places in Riyadh Province